Porush may refer to:

People
Menachem Porush (1916-2010), Israeli politician
Meir Porush, Israeli politician
Shlomo Zalman Porush, Belorussian rabbi
Danny Porush, American businessman and stock fraudster

Places
Porush, Iran (disambiguation)